Sechenov is a lunar impact crater on the far side of the Moon. It lies to the southwest of the huge walled plain Hertzsprung, and to the east-southeast of the crater Timiryazev. To the south-southeast of Sechenov lies Paschen.

This crater has taken a moderate amount of wear and tear as a result of subsequent impacts. The outer rim is somewhat worn and uneven. There is a small crater intruding into the southwestern outer rim. A joined pair of small craters is located in the middle of the interior floor, and there is a small craterlet along the eastern base of the inner wall.

Satellite craters
By convention these features are identified on lunar maps by placing the letter on the side of the crater midpoint that is closest to Sechenov.

References

 
 
 
 
 
 
 
 
 
 
 
 

Impact craters on the Moon